Professor James Watson FRAM (4 September 1951 – 6 February 2011) held principal trumpet posts with the Royal Philharmonic Orchestra, Royal Opera House and London Sinfonietta. His international chamber music work included the Nash Ensemble and leading the world-famous Philip Jones Brass Ensemble. He was particularly active in film and television having recorded with Elton John, Paul McCartney and Peter Gabriel. Watson's conducting positions included artistic director of the Black Dyke Mills Band, 1992–2000.

James Watson was artistic director of the National Youth Brass Band of Wales for six years and was vice-president of the National Youth Wind Orchestra of Great Britain.

He was very active as a teacher and had been head of brass at the Royal Academy of Music since 2001.

Watson's death was announced on 6 February 2011.

References

External links 
 James Watson at the Royal Academy of Music

British music educators
English trumpeters
Male trumpeters
English conductors (music)
British male conductors (music)
Academics of the Royal Academy of Music
1951 births
2011 deaths